William Burnett was a former President of Franklin College in New Athens, Ohio, serving from 1839 to 1840. He also served as Associate Reformed Presbyterian Church minister at various locations in Pennsylvania before leaving the ministry to head west.

References

Washington & Jefferson College alumni
People from Abbeville County, South Carolina
Franklin College (New Athens, Ohio)
Year of death missing
1808 births
Associate Reformed Presbyterian Church